This is a list of mayors of Moose Jaw, Saskatchewan.

From 1920 to 1925, Moose Jaw mayors were elected using Instant-runoff voting. All other times First past the post was used.

References 

 

Moose Jaw